The men's pole vault was one of four men's jumping events on the athletics program at the 1968 Summer Olympics. The competition had two rounds, qualifying and a final, which were held on 14 and 16 October respectively at the Estadio Olímpico Universitario in Mexico City. Twenty-three athletes from 15 nations competed. The maximum number of athletes per nation had been set at 3 since the 1930 Olympic Congress. The event was won by Bob Seagren of the United States, the nation's 16th consecutive victory in the men's pole vault. Claus Schiprowski of West Germany took silver, while Wolfgang Nordwig of East Germany took bronze—the first medals for each of those nations as separate teams, though two West German vaulters had earned silver and bronze for the United Team of Germany in 1964.

Background

This was the 16th appearance of the event, which is one of 12 athletics events to have been held at every Summer Olympics. The returning finalists from the 1964 Games were bronze medalist Klaus Lehnertz of the United Team of Germany (now representing West Germany), fifth-place finisher Hennadiy Bleznitsov of the Soviet Union, eleventh-place finisher John Pennel of the United States, fifteenth-place finishers Herve D'Encausse of France and Ignacio Sola of Spain, and eighteenth-place finisher Christos Papanikolau of Greece. Bob Seagren was the world record holder and the favorite, though Pennel (who had held the record for parts of 1963, 1964, 1966, and 1967) was also a strong contender.

Argentina made its first appearance in the event; East Germany and West Germany competed separately for the first time. The United States made its 16th appearance, the only nation to have competed at every Olympic men's pole vault to that point.

Competition format

The competition consisted of two rounds, qualification and final. In both rounds, each athlete had three attempts at each height and was eliminated from the competition if he failed to clear that height. Athletes could choose to pass onto the next height, although any failed attempts were carried over into that height. The heights increased in increments of five centimetres. Athletes who successfully jumped the qualifying height  progressed to the final round. In the event that fewer than twelve athletes cleared that height, the best twelve athletes (including those tied with athletes in the top twelve) would progress to the next round.

Records

Prior to the competition, the existing World and Olympic records were as follows.

Eleven men cleared 5.15 metres or higher to break the old Olympic record. Nine cleared 5.20 metres or higher. Seven cleared 5.25 metres or higher. Six cleared 5.30 metres. Five cleared 5.35 metres (or higher). The three medalists, Bob Seagren, Claus Schiprowski, and Wolfgang Nordwig, all cleared 5.40 metres—where the Olympic record sat after the competition, as none could clear higher.

Schedule

Results

Qualifying

Final

With three men tied at 5.40 metres, the countback rules determined the medals. At the final height (5.40), Nordwig had failed twice before clearing while the other two men had each failed only once before succeeding; Nordwig therefore took third place and the bronze medal. Because Seagren and Schiprowski were matched at one failure at 5.40 metres, the total number of failures for each before that was the next tiebreaker. Seagren had failed once before 5.40 metres (at 5.20), while Schiprowski had failed twice (at 5.25 and 5.35); Seagren therefore was the gold medalist and Schiprowski took silver.

References

Men's pole vault
Pole vault at the Olympics
Men's events at the 1968 Summer Olympics